Edward Ludlow Mooney (March 25, 1813 – July 10, 1887) was an American painter.

Biography
Edward Ludlow Mooney was born in New York City on March 25, 1813.

He was trained by Henry Inman and William Page, and was known for his portraits of famous politicians and officials.

He died in New York on July 10, 1887.

Selected works

References

External links
 

1813 births
1887 deaths
19th-century American painters
19th-century American male artists
American male painters
American portrait painters